Patricia Eva "Bonnie" Pointer (July 11, 1950– June 8, 2020) was an American singer, best known for having been a member of the vocal group, the Pointer Sisters. Pointer scored several moderate solo hits after leaving the Pointers in 1977, including a disco cover of the Elgins' "Heaven Must Have Sent You" which became a U.S. top 20 pop hit on September 1, 1979.

Career 
Bonnie and youngest sister June began singing together in their father's West Oakland Church of God in Oakland, California. They formed the Pointers (otherwise known as the Pair) in 1969. After Anita joined the duo that same year, they changed their name to the Pointer Sisters and recorded several singles for Atlantic Records between 1971 and 1972.  In December 1972, they recruited oldest sister Ruth and released their debut album as the Pointer Sisters in 1973. Their self-titled debut yielded the hit "Yes We Can Can". Between 1973 and 1977, the Pointers donned 1940s fashions and sang in a style reminiscent of the Andrews Sisters. Their music included R&B, funk, rock and roll, gospel, country and soul.

Anita and Bonnie wrote the group's crossover country hit, "Fairytale", in 1974, which also became a Top 20 pop hit and won the group their first Grammy for Best Vocal by a Duo or Group, Country. Anita and Bonnie also were nominated for Best Country Song at the same ceremony. In 1977, Bonnie left the group to begin a solo career. The remaining sisters continued scoring hits from the late-1970s to the mid-1980s and had a major breakthrough with their 1983 album Break Out. In 1978, Pointer signed with Motown and in the same year, she released "Heaven Must Have Sent You", which reached No. 11 on the Billboard Hot 100 chart. Pointer released three solo albums, including two self-titled albums for Motown, before retiring from the studio.

Reviewing her 1978 self-titled LP, Robert Christgau wrote in Christgau's Record Guide: Rock Albums of the Seventies (1981): "Thanks to (co-producer) Berry Gordy and the miracle of modern multitracking, Bonnie makes like the Marvelettes of your dreams for an entire side. People didn't conceive vocals this intricate and funky back in Motown's prime, much less overdub them single-larynxed, and the result is remakes that outdo the originals—by Brenda Holloway and the Elgins—and originals that stand alongside. The other side comprises originals of more diminutive stature co-written by (co-producer) Jeffrey Bowen."

Pointer appeared on Soul Train on March 2, 1985 (Season 14, Episode 20). She still continued to perform, and reunited with her sisters on two occasions: when the group received a star on the Hollywood Walk of Fame in 1994, and during a Las Vegas performance in 1996 singing "Jump (for My Love)". At the beginning of 2008, she embarked on a European tour, and was working on her autobiography. Pointer performed at the Trump Taj Mahal in Atlantic City on Saturday, October 25, 2008. Pointer also starred in Monte Hellman's 2010 romantic thriller Road to Nowhere.

Personal life and death 
In 1978, Pointer married Motown Records producer Jeffrey Bowen. They separated in 2004, and officially divorced in 2016. 

Due to ten years of alcoholic liver disease and cirrhosis, Pointer died from a cardiac arrest at her home in Los Angeles on June 8, 2020, at the age of 69.

Discography

Albums

Singles

References

External links 
 

1950 births
2020 deaths
20th-century African-American women singers
20th-century American singers
20th-century American women singers
21st-century African-American people
21st-century African-American women
African-American songwriters
Alcohol-related deaths in California
American dance musicians
American disco musicians
American rhythm and blues musicians
Deaths from cirrhosis
Motown artists
Musicians from Oakland, California
Bonnie
Singers from California
Songwriters from California
The Pointer Sisters members